Rhyacionia hafneri is a species of moth of the family Tortricidae. It is found in the Czech Republic, Hungary, Croatia, Bulgaria and Slovenia.

The wingspan is 20–22 mm.

The larvae feed on Pinus nigra and possibly Pinus sylvestris.

References

Moths described in 1937
Eucosmini
Moths of Europe